Kurtalan District is a district of Siirt Province in Turkey. The town of Kurtalan is the seat and the district had a population of 60,592 in 2021.

The district is populated by Kurds. The current District Governor is Ihsan Emre Aydin.

Settlements 
The district encompasses two municipalities, fifty-five villages and forty-seven hamlets.

Municipalities 

 Kayabağlar
 Kurtalan

Villages 

 Ağaçlıpınar
 Akçalı
 Akçegedik
 Akdam
 Aksöğüt
 Atalay
 Avcılar
 Aydemir
 Azıklı
 Bağlıca
 Ballıkaya
 Beşler
 Beykent
 Bozhüyük
 Bölüktepe
 Çakıllı
 Çalıdüzü
 Çattepe
 Çayırlı
 Çeltikbaşı
 Demirkuyu
 Derince
 Ekinli
 Erdurağı
 Gökdoğan
 Gözpınar
 Gürgöze
 Güzeldere
 İğdeli
 İncirlik
 Kapıkaya
 Karabağ
 Kayalısu
 Kılıçlı
 Konakpınar
 Saipbeyli
 Şenköy
 Taşoluk
 Tatlı
 Teylan
 Tosunbağı
 Toytepe
 Tulumtaş
 Tütünköy
 Uluköy
 Üçpınar
 Yakıttepe
 Yanarsu
 Yayıklı
 Yellice
 Yeniköprü
 Yeşilkonak
 Yoldurağı
 Yuvalı
 Yürekveren

References 

Districts of Siirt Province